Lee Chang-ho (born 1975) is a South Korean Go player of 9-dan rank.

Lee Chang-ho may also refer to:
 Lee Chang-ho (table tennis) (born 1969), South Korean para table tennis player
 Lee Chang-ho (baseball) (born 1987), South Korean pitcher
 Lee Chang-ho (footballer) (born 1989), South Korean footballer
 Ri Chang-ho (born 1990), North Korean footballer
 Lee Chang-ho (weightlifter) (born 1987), South Korean weightlifter
 Lee Chang-ho (volleyball) South Korean volleyball coach